The 1938 Major League Baseball season was contested from April 18 to October 15, 1938. The Chicago Cubs and New York Yankees were the regular season champions of the National League and American League, respectively. The Yankees then defeated the Cubs in the World Series, four games to none. The Yankees became the first team to win the World Series three years in a row.

Awards and honors
Baseball Hall of Fame
Grover Cleveland Alexander
Alexander Cartwright
Henry Chadwick
Most Valuable Player
Jimmie Foxx, Boston Red Sox, 1B (AL)
Ernie Lombardi, Cincinnati Reds, C (NL)
The Sporting News Player of the Year Award
Johnny Vander Meer, Cincinnati Reds, P
The Sporting News Manager of the Year Award
Joe McCarthy, New York Yankees

Statistical leaders

Standings

American League

National League

Postseason

Bracket

Managers

American League

National League

Home Field Attendance

References

External links
1938 Major League Baseball season schedule at Baseball Reference

 
Major League Baseball seasons